Marina Cordobés Navarro (born 28 April 1997) is a Spanish water polo player, who plays for CN Sabadell.

She participated in the 2014 Women's LEN Super Cup, 2016 Women's LEN Super Cup, 2019 Women's LEN Super Cup, 2014–15 LEN Euro League Women, 2015–16 LEN Euro League Women and 2019 Women's LEN Super Cup

References

External links 
 https://globalsportsarchive.com/people/water_polo/marlon-mustapha/367756/

1997 births
Spanish female water polo players
Living people
21st-century Spanish women